The Robert Hosmer Morse House is a historic house at 1301 Knollwood Circle in Lake Forest, Illinois. Built in 1932, the house served as a summer home for businessman Robert Hosmer Morse and his family. The architectural firm of Zimmerman, Saxe & Zimmerman designed the house, which combined elements of the Moderne and Art Deco styles. As the wealthy residents of Lake Forest typically used traditional designs for their homes, the modern architectural styles were an unusual choice. The house's design features a stucco exterior, a horizontal emphasis throughout, casement windows, decorative limestone around the front entrance, and a recessed third floor.

The house was added to the National Register of Historic Places on August 10, 2000.

References

National Register of Historic Places in Lake County, Illinois
Houses on the National Register of Historic Places in Illinois
Art Deco architecture in Illinois
Moderne architecture in Illinois
Houses completed in 1932